Belvedere is a barrio (neighbourhood or district) of Montevideo, Uruguay. An area known as Paso Molino, which starts in the Prado and extends into Belvedere, is a frequented shopping venue.

Location
Belvedere borders Nuevo París to the northwest, Sayago to the northeast, Paso de las Duranas to the east, Prado to the southeast, La Teja and Tres Ombúes to the south.

Educational facilities
 Colegio y Liceo San Francisco de Asís(private, Roman Catholic, Friars Minor Capuchin)

Places of worship
 Church of St Francis of Assisi (Roman Catholic, Friars Minor Capuchin)
 Sanctuary Chapel of the Blessed Francesca Rubatto (Roman Catholic, Capuchin Sisters of Mother Rubatto)

See also 

Barrios of Montevideo

References

External links 

 Intendencia de Montevideo / Historia / Barrios / (see section) Nuevo París, Belvedere y 19 de Abril
 Revista Raices / Historia del barrio Belvedere

 
Barrios of Montevideo